Trstené pri Hornáde is a village and municipality in Košice-okolie District in the Kosice Region of eastern Slovakia.

History
In historical records the village was first mentioned in 1270.

Geography
The village lies at an altitude of 204 metres and covers an area of 12.9 km2. It has a population of about 1,565 people. The village is growing quickly and has had approximately 100 new inhabitants since December 2004.

Ethnicity
The population is almost entirely Slovak in ethnicity.

Culture
The village has a public library,  a football playground and food facilities.

External links

Villages and municipalities in Košice-okolie District